Waycross is an unincorporated community in Jackson Township, Brown County, in the U.S. state of Indiana.

The community is home to the camp and conference center of the Episcopal Diocese of Indianapolis, which opened in 1957.

History

The Bilhiemer family built the original house (now called the Main House) and tried to farm the property.  The farm failed and a man named Charlie Murphy bought the property.  History tells that the Mr. Murphy tried to run a gambling operation out of the property.  This too failed.

The leadership of Jim and Marian Mara in the early 1950s got Waycross off the ground. The summer camping program of the Diocese began in the 1940s and sessions were held at rented facilities. The Mara’s and Father Edward Callanan, Jr. purchased the original property. Bud Reahard and family purchased the Hickory Hill land. Hickory Hill became the site of the Hickory Hill Camp program, where campers learned primitive camp skills while staying in teepees, covered wagons or cabins. The name Waycross is described in the book edited by John Simmons, The History of Way cross-Hickory Hill Episcopal Camps 1957-1997.  “The camp just happens to lie at the imaginary intersection of a cross that overlays the Episcopal Diocese of Indianapolis. Hence the name Waycross, or where ways cross—a simple yet ingenious way of identifying its location that yielded one of the prettier sites in the state.”

Currently available for church, school and non-profit use, Waycross has a 32 room conference center with hotel style rooms, 13 rooms in the Main House and an adjacent sleeping wing with hotel and dorm style accommodations, 10 winterized camp cabins and the Hickory Hill Retreat House with rustic retreat and lodge space for 12-14 people.  The summer camp program operates in June and July.  The facility also hosts other camp programs for 2–3 weeks each summer.  A climbing tower and low ropes challenge course are tools that are available for leadership development.

Geography
The site is centered in a valley near the intersection of Bear Creek and Richards Roads.

References

Unincorporated communities in Brown County, Indiana
Unincorporated communities in Indiana